The Albany adder (Bitis albanica) is a viper species.   It was previously considered a subspecies  of Bitis cornuta. Its range is restricted to eastern and southern Cape Province in South Africa. Like all vipers, it is venomous.

It is extremely rare, and had been thought potentially extinct until four live specimens and one road kill were found in late 2016 or early 2017. Only 12 individuals have been identified since the species was discovered in 1937.

Description
This subspecies does not have the "horns" that are characteristic of the nominate race, B. c. cornuta, although it does have prominent bumps over the eyes. The coloration is brown to reddish brown, and they may also lack the distinctive pattern of the typical form.

This is a small adder.

Taxonomy
Branch (1999) elevated B. c. albanica to species level: Bitis albanica.

It is commonly known as the Albany adder, eastern hornsman adder, or eastern many-horned adder.Distribution and habitat
It is found in Eastern and southern Cape Province in South Africa.

The type locality is listed as "The Dene (Port Elizabeth), Addo, and from dry scrub districts near Grahamstown such as Brak Kloof, farm Springvale, and Kleinpoort near Committees ... Eastern Cape Province, South Africa."

References

Further reading

 Branch WR. 1999. Dwarf adders of the Bitis cornuta-inornata complex (Serpentes: Viperidae) in Southern Africa. Kaupia (Darmstadt) (8): 39-63.
Hewitt J. 1937. A Guide to the Vertebrate Fauna of the Eastern Cape Province, South Africa, Part II: Reptiles, Amphibians, and Freshwater Fishes. Grahamstown, South Africa: Albany Museum. vii + 141 pp. (Bitis cornuta albanica'', p. 76.)

Bitis
Taxa named by John Hewitt (herpetologist)
Reptiles described in 1937